Lewis Johnson Forman (January 7, 1855 – January 3, 1933) was the Republican President of the West Virginia Senate from Grant County and served from 1909 to 1911. He had previously served as the prosecuting attorney of Grant County, a position he held for 16 years. He died in 1933 of heart disease.

References

West Virginia state senators
Presidents of the West Virginia State Senate
1855 births
1933 deaths
People from Preston County, West Virginia
People from Petersburg, West Virginia
County prosecuting attorneys in West Virginia